Actin-binding proteins (also known as ABPs) are proteins that bind to actin. This may mean ability to bind actin monomers, or polymers, or both.

Many actin-binding proteins, including α-actinin, β-spectrin, dystrophin, utrophin and fimbrin, do this through the actin-binding calponin homology domain.

This is a list of actin-binding proteins in alphabetical order.

0–9
25kDa
25kDa ABP from aorta p185neu
30akDA 110 kD dimer ABP
30bkDa 110 kD (Drebrin)
34kDA
45kDa
p53
p58gag 
p116rip

A
a-actinin
Abl
ABLIM Actin-Interacting MAPKKK
ABP120
ABP140
Abp1p
ABP280 (Filamin)
ABP50 (EF-1a)
Acan 125 (Carmil)
ActA
Actibind
Actin
Actinfilin
Actinogelin
Actin-regulating kinases
Actin-Related Proteins
Actobindin
Actolinkin
Actopaxin
Actophorin
Acumentin (= L-plastin)
Adducin
ADF/Cofilin
Adseverin (scinderin)
Afadin
AFAP-110
Affixin
Aginactin
AIP1
Aldolase
Angiogenin
Anillin
Annexins
Aplyronine
Archvillin
Arginine kinase
Arp2/3 complex

B
Band 4.1
Band 4.9(Dematin)
b-actinin
b-Cap73
Bifocal
Bistramide A
BPAG1
Brevin (Gelsolin)

C
c-Abl
Calpactin (Annexin)
CHO1
Cortactin
CamKinase II
Calponin
Chondramide
Cortexillin
CAP
Caltropin
CH-ILKBP
CPb3
Cap100
Calvasculin
Ciboulot
Coactosin
CAP23
CARMIL
Acan125
Cingulin
Cytovillin (Ezrin)
CapZ/Capping Protein
a-Catenin
Cofilin
CR16
Caldesmon
CCT
Comitin
Calicin
Centuarin
Coronin

D
DBP40
Drebrin
Dematin (Band 4.9)
Dynacortin
Destrin (ADF/cofilin)
Dystonins
Diaphanous
Dystroglycan
DNase I
Dystrophin
Doliculide
Dolastatins

E
EAST
Endossin
EF-1a (ABP50)
Eps15
EF-1b
EPLIN
EF-2
Epsin
EGF receptor
ERK
ENC-1
ERM proteins (ezrin, radixin, moesin, plus merlin)
END3p
Ezrin (the E of ERM protein family)

F
F17R
Fodrin (spectrin)
Fascin
Formins
Fessilin
Frabin
FHL3
Fragmin
Fhos
FLNA   (filamin A)
Fimbrin (plastin)

G
GAP43
Glycogenins
Gas2
G-proteins
Gastrin-Binding Protein
Gelactins I-IV
Gelsolins
Girdin
Glucokinase

H
Harmonin b
Hrp36
Hexokinase
Hrp65-2
Hectochlorin
HS1 (actin binding protein)
Helicase II
Hsp27
HIP1 (Huntingtin Interacting protein 1)
Hsp70
Histactophilin
Hsp90
Histidine rich protein II
Hsp100

I
Inhibitor of apoptosis (IAP)
Insertin
Interaptin
IP3Kinase A (Inositol 1,4,5-trisphosphate 3-kinase A)
IQGAP
Integrins

J
Jaspisamide A
Jasplakinolide

K
Kabiramide C
Kaptin
Kettin
Kelch protein

L
5-Lipoxygenase
Limatin
Lim Kinases
Lim Proteins
L-plastin
Lymphocyte Specific Protein 1 (LSP1)

M
MACF1 
MacMARKS
Mena
Myopodin
MAP1A
Merlin (related to the ERM proteins)
Myosins
MAP-1C
Metavinculin
Moesin (the M of ERM proteins)
Myosin light chain kinase
MAL
Mip-90
Myosin Light Chain A1
MARKS
MIM
MAYP
Mycalolide (a macroglide drug)
Mayven
Myelin basic protein

N
Naphthylphthalamic acid binding protein  (NPA) N-RAP
Nebulin
N-WASP
Neurabin
Nullo
Neurexins
Neurocalcin
Nexillin

O
OYE2

P
Palladin
Plastin
p30
PAK (p21-activated Kinase)
Plectin
p47PHOX
Parvin (actopaxin)
Prefoldin
p53
PASK (Proline, Alanine rich Ste20 related Kinase)
Presenilin I
p58
Phalloidin (not a protein; a small cyclic peptide)
Profilin
p185neu
Ponticulin
Protein kinase C
Porin
P.IB
Prk1p (actin regulating kinase)

R
Radixin (the R of ERM proteins)
Rapsyn
Rhizopodin
RPL45
RTX toxin (Vibrio cholerae)
RVS 167

S
Sac6
Sla1p
Srv2 (CAP)
S-adenosyl-L-homocysteine hydrolase, (SAHH)
Sla2p
Synaptopodin
Scinderin (adseverin)
Synapsins
Scruin
Spectrin
Severin
Spectraplakins
SVSII
Shot (Short stop)
Spire
Shroom
Smitin (Smooth Musc.Titin)
Supervillin
SipA
Smoothelin
Sucrose synthetase
SipC
Sra-1
Spinophilin
Ssk2p
Swinholide

T
Talin protein
Toxophilin
Twinfilin
Tau
Trabeculin
Twinstar
TCP-1
Transgelin
Transgelin 2
Transgelin 3
Tensin
Tropomodulin
Thymosin
Tropomyosin
Titin
Troponin
TOR2
Tubulin bIV

U
Ulapualide
Utrophin
Unc-87
Unc-60 (ADF/cofilins)

V
VASP
Vav
Verprolin
VDAC
Vibrio cholerae RTX toxin
Villin
Vinculin
Vitamin D-binding protein

W
WIP
WASp

Y
Y-box proteins
YpkA (YopO)

Z
Zipper protein
Zo-1
Zyxin

See also

Cytoskeletal drugs

References

External links
 The Encyclopaedia of Actin-Binding Proteins (and Drugs)– alphabetical list, sourced profile for each
 
 

Cell biology
Proteins